Prophetstown may refer to 

In Illinois, USA:
 Prophetstown, Illinois
 Prophetstown Township, Whiteside County, Illinois
 Prophetstown State Recreation Area

In Indiana, USA:
Prophet's Town or Prophetstown was the site of the 1811 Battle of Tippecanoe 
Prophetstown State Park, near the battle site